Pseudosphenoptera basalis is a moth in the subfamily Arctiinae first described by Francis Walker in 1854. It is found in Brazil (Tefé, São Paulo).

References

Arctiinae